Nikolskoye is a rural locality (a selo) in Ismagilovsky Selsoviet, Aurgazinsky District, Bashkortostan, Russia. The population was 18 as of 2010. There are 2 streets.

Geography 
Nikolskoye is located 29 km north of Tolbazy (the district's administrative centre) by road. Novotimoshkino is the nearest rural locality.

References 

Rural localities in Aurgazinsky District